Ben Sim (born 30 July 1985 in Cooma, New South Wales) is an Australian cross-country skier who has competed since 2002. At the 2010 Winter Olympics in Vancouver, he finished 20th in the team sprint, 45th in the 15 km, and 47th in the 15 km + 15 km double pursuit event.

Sim's best finish at the FIS Nordic World Ski Championships was 14th twice (Team sprint: 2007, 4 x 10 km: 2009).

His best World Cup finish was 16th in the team sprint event at Whistler Olympic Park in January 2009.

Sim is taking up Nordic combined. His build has been described as more suited to Nordic combined than cross-country skiing, and he is able to obtain funding for competing in that sport he would not get in cross-country skiing.

In December 2016, Sim was named to Australia's team for the 2017 Asian Winter Games in Sapporo, Japan.

References
 

1985 births
Australian male cross-country skiers
Australian male Nordic combined skiers
Cross-country skiers at the 2010 Winter Olympics
Living people
Olympic cross-country skiers of Australia
Cross-country skiers at the 2017 Asian Winter Games
People from Cooma
Sportsmen from New South Wales
21st-century Australian people